Dmitry Kokarev (born 18 February 1982 in Penza) is a Russian chess Grandmaster (2007).

Chess career

Kokarev won the U-18 section of the World Youth Chess Championship in 1999 in Oropesa del Mar, Spain. In 2009, he tied for 1st–8th with Sergey Volkov, Igor Lysyj, Aleksandr Rakhmanov, Valerij Popov, Denis Khismatullin, Dmitry Andreikin and Dmitry Bocharov in the Voronezh Open tournament. In 2010, he won the Mumbai Mayor's Cup chess tournament and tied for 1st–6th with Maxim Turov, Alexey Dreev, Martyn Kravtsiv, Baskaran Adhiban and Aleksej Aleksandrov in the 2nd Orissa Open tournament in Bhubaneshwar. In 2013 Kokarev won the Dvorkovich Memorial in Taganrog and sharing first at the Chigorin Memorial in Saint Petersburg, finishing second on tiebreak score. In 2014 he won the 10th Ugra Governor's Cup in Khanty-Mansiysk. Kokarev played for Novosibirsk's team "Siberia" which won both the Russian Team Chess Championship Premiere League and the European Club Cup in 2015.

Notable games
Dmitry Kokarev vs Teimour Radjabov, Wch U18 1999, Formation: King's Indian Attack (A07) 1-0
Dmitry Kokarev vs Ratmir Kholmov, White Nights 2001, Caro-Kann Defense: Finnish Variation (B16) 1-0

References

External links 
Dmitry Kokarev chess games at 365Chess.com

1982 births
Living people
People from Penza
Chess grandmasters
Russian chess players
World Youth Chess Champions